Jorhat Gymkhana Club is a sports venue located in Jorhat, Assam. Club built in 1876 by D. Slimmons. The club has been a venue for horse races, lawn tennis grass courts, swimming pool, billiards, polo, golf, cricket etc. ever since its inauguration. The Governor's Cup is played here every year with a lush green 9-hole golf course circuit.

The golf club is third oldest in India after Royal Calcutta Golf Club (1829) and Thiruvananthapuram Golf Club (1850). The club offers facilities in lawn tennis grass courts, swimming pool, billiards, polo, gentleman's bar and cinema theatre.  The cricket ground here is known as Jorhat Gymkhana Ground and has a capacity of 8,000 as well as has a turf wicket. The ground hosted the matches of CK Nayudu Trophy which is Under-23 Indian domestic cricket tournament as well as the Senior Women's National Cricket Championship. The club is home of Khelmati sports club uses this ground for practising cricket. The Club Road was the first asphalt road laid which connect the city centre with the Jorhat Gymkhana Club.

References

External links 

 Cricketarchive
 Cricinfo
 Wikimapia

Golf clubs and courses in India
Horse racing venues in India
Cricket grounds in Assam
Tourist attractions in Assam
Multi-purpose stadiums in India
Sports venues in Assam
Jorhat
1876 establishments in India
Sports venues completed in 1876